Jimmy Coupar (3 March 1869 – January 1953) was a Scottish footballer. His regular position was as a forward. He was born in Dundee. He played for Dundee Our Boys, St Johnstone, Rotherham Town, Luton Town, Swindon Town, Linfield, and Manchester United.

External links
MUFCInfo.com profile

1869 births
1953 deaths
Footballers from Dundee
Scottish footballers
St Johnstone F.C. players
Luton Town F.C. players
Manchester United F.C. players
Linfield F.C. players
Swindon Town F.C. players
Association football forwards